Magdalena Maleeva was the defending champion, but did not compete this year.

Marzia Grossi won the title by defeating Barbara Rittner 3–6, 7–5, 6–1 in the final.

Seeds

Draw

Finals

Top half

Bottom half

References

External links
 Official results archive (ITF)
 Official results archive (WTA)

WTA San Marino
WTA San Marino